E17 or E-17 may refer to:
 Queen's Indian Defence, Encyclopaedia of Chess Openings code
 European route E17, a road through Belgium and eastern France
 East 17, a British pop group
 Enlightenment (X window manager) release 17
 E17, a postcode district in the E postcode area for east London
 Ever 17: The Out of Infinity, a Japanese video game
 E17 screw, a type of Edison lightbulb screw
 HMS E17, a British submarine of World War I
 Kan-etsu Expressway, route E17 in Japan
 Butterworth Outer Ring Road, route E17 in Malaysia

ru:Enlightenment#Enlightenment DR17